Ben Brancel (born July 31, 1950) is a Wisconsin politician and former legislator who served as the Wisconsin Secretary of Agriculture until his retirement in 2017.

Born in Portage, Wisconsin, Brancel graduated from University of Wisconsin–Platteville. Brancel served on the town board and board of education. Brancel managed a dairy operation for 22 years and now runs a 290-acre family farm with his wife, son, and daughter-in-law. From 1987 until 1997, he served in the Wisconsin State Assembly representing District 42, and served as Speaker of the House. In 1997, Brancel resigned from the Wisconsin Assembly to serve as Wisconsin Secretary of Agriculture, Trade, and Consumer Protection in Governor Tommy Thompson's administration.  He served in that capacity until 2001. In 2001, Brancel was appointed as director of the Wisconsin Farm Service Agency by the Bush Administration, where he served until early 2009. Later that year, he served as the part-time state relations liaison for the University of Wisconsin-Madison's College of Agricultural and Life Sciences.

In January 2011, Brancel was appointed by Governor Scott Walker to serve as Agriculture, Trade, and Consumer Protection Secretary once again.

Notes

1950 births
Living people
People from Portage, Wisconsin
University of Wisconsin–Platteville alumni
Speakers of the Wisconsin State Assembly
Republican Party members of the Wisconsin State Assembly
State cabinet secretaries of Wisconsin